US Post Office-Walton is a historic post office building located at Walton in Delaware County, New York, United States. It was built in 1936–1937, and is one of a number of post offices in New York State designed by the Office of the Supervising Architect of the Treasury Department, Louis A. Simon.   It is a one-story, five bay, steel frame building on a raised limestone clad foundation in the Colonial Revival style. The front section is symmetrically massed and features a slightly recessed, three bay central entrance.

It was listed on the National Register of Historic Places in 1989.  It is located in the Gardiner Place Historic District.

See also
National Register of Historic Places listings in Delaware County, New York

References

Walton
National Register of Historic Places in Delaware County, New York
Government buildings completed in 1937
Colonial Revival architecture in New York (state)
Buildings and structures in Delaware County, New York
Historic district contributing properties in New York (state)